Darius Helton (October 2, 1954 – October 3, 2006) was an American football guard. He played for the Kansas City Chiefs in 1977 and for the BC Lions in 1980.

References

1954 births
2006 deaths
American football offensive guards
North Carolina Central Eagles football players
Kansas City Chiefs players
BC Lions players